Cockburn is a Scottish surname that originated in the Borders region of the Scottish Lowlands. In the United States most branches of the same family have adopted the simplified spelling 'Coburn'; other branches have altered the name slightly to 'Cogburn'. The French branch of the family uses the spelling 'de Cockborne', with the middle "ck" being pronounced.

Family origins 

The Cockburn surname had appeared by the early 13th century, when it was employed to identify individuals from a district or location called Cockburn (modern spelling). The name Cockburn has been viewed as originating from the juxtaposition of 'Cock', derived from the Old English word 'cocc' meaning 'moor-cock', 'wild bird' or 'hill', with 'burn' derived from the old word 'burna' meaning 'brook' or 'stream'. There are several possible candidates for this geographical name including: a former 'Cokoueburn' district in early medieval Roxburghshire; a place called 'Calkesburne' that was mentioned in a charter from 1162 to 1190 that awarded the land of Hermanston in East Lothian; the hill called Cockburn Law, north of present-day Duns in Berwickshire, which was fortified in Iron Age times; and the town of Cockburnspath, originally known as 'Kolbrand's Path', on the eastern coast of Scotland. There are several Cockburn placenames that are located near Cockburn Law along Whiteadder Water including Cockburn farm, Cockburn Mill, and the now ruined farm Cockburn East. A Cockburn Tower reportedly existed in this same general area. It is unclear, however, whether this region in Berwickshire is in fact the true origin of the family name.

In perhaps the first recorded mention of a Cockburn, a Petro de Cokburne witnessed a charter in the "Register of the House of Soltre" that described a gift of arable land in Lempitlaw, just east of Kelso in Roxburghshire in about 1190–1220, during the reign of King William "the Lion" (1165–1214). However, the dating of this document has been recently revised to 1251–1274.  A Robert de Cockburn is mentioned as a ‘serviens’ (servant or sergeant) in a charter, dating from 1232 to 1242, in which land is granted to the Chapel of St. Nicholas, next to a bridge over the River Spey in Moray.  The knight Sir Roberto de Cokeburn (perhaps the same Robert) is mentioned in a charter that was prepared in Chirnside on 4 November 1261 during the reign of Patrick III, Earl of Dunbar (1248–1270).  Sir Roberto de Cokeburne is mentioned in another charter (dated to 1269–1289) as being the constable of the royal burgh of Roxburgh.  A Petro de Kokeburne is mentioned on a document, dated from 15 May 1285, that records the sale of land to Kelso Abbey, near Roxburgh.  In the mid 13th century, the landowner Johannes de Kocburn (John de Cockburn) granted land near his property at Collessie in Fife to Lindores Abbey.  In the summer of 1296, along with the bulk of the Scottish nobility and senior clergy, Pieres de Cokeburn and Thomas de Cokeburn 'del counte de Rokesburgh' signed the Ragman Roll pledging their allegiance to King Edward I of England.  However, it appears that at least one other Cockburn landowner incurred the disfavor of Longshanks at about this time.  In a charter dated March 20, 1312, King Edward II restored to Nigel de Cockburn his former land in Megget (likely the same land, along the Megget Water now in Selkirkshire, that later became known as Henderland).  This land had been awarded to another man by the previous English king because Nigel had been declared a rebel.  Possibly Nigel de Cockburn had chosen to avoid signing the Ragman Roll back in 1296.  Perhaps Edward II was attempting to secure new Scottish allies prior to his next invasion of Scotland because in the same charter the king restored land to eleven other former Scottish rebels.

Historically there have been many alternative spellings of the family name.  Early medieval spellings included 'Cokburne', 'Cokeburne', 'Kokeburne' and other variations.  In Scotland the spelling of the family name had stabilized to 'Cockburn' by the late 17th century, and this is the spelling most commonly used today in British Commonwealth countries.  In the United States, the simplified spelling 'Coburn' is more widely used than 'Cockburn'.  In Cumberland, England, the 'Cockbain' family emerged from Scottish Cockburn ancestors.  A branch of the family was established in France in the 16th century by mercenary soldiers under the terms of the Auld Alliance.  In 1494, a Thomas Cocquebourne was serving as an archer in the Garde Écossaise, which was the personal bodyguard of the King of France. Many more Cockburn mercenaries served the Kings of France in this elite unit over the next century. Cockburn descendants in France today use the family name 'de Cockborne'. Another branch of the family used the name Cokborgne and formed part of the nobility of Champagne. The early 17th century mercenary leader Samuel Cockburn used the spelling 'Cobron' while working for the King of Sweden.  In the late 17th century, a Cockburn merchant established a German branch of the family, which adopted the surname 'Kabrun' in the Hanseatic port of Danzig.  A great-grandson of this Scottish-German Kabrun was the wealthy merchant and renowned book collector, art collector and philanthropist Jacob Kabrun Jr. (1759–1814).

The Cockburn name was well known in the English possessions of the Caribbean from the 17th century onwards.  By the early 18th century, Cockburns were living in the Bahamas, Barbados and Jamaica. Cockburn Town, the capital of the Turks and Caicos Islands, was founded in 1681 by salt traders from the Bahamas.  Dr. James Cockburn (b. c1659 in Langton, Scotland – d. 1718 in Jamaica), Dr. Thomas Cockburn (1700-c1769) and Dr. James Cockburn (c1770-1798) were three generations of medical doctors from the same Cockburn family in Jamaica.  The first doctor in this line was the third son of Sir Archibald Cockburn, 2nd Baronet of Langton. Admiral Sir George Cockburn led successful naval operations against the French and Spanish in the Caribbean during the Napoleonic Wars. Sir Francis Cockburn was a colonial administrator in both the British Honduras (1830–37) and the Bahamas (1837-4).  Cockburn Town, the administrative center of San Salvador Island in the Bahamas, was named after Sir Francis.  Some Scottish Cockburn men settled in the area and married Caribbean women, and their descendants live today in Trinidad and Tobago and elsewhere in the Caribbean and North America.

The rise and fall of the Cockburn landowners 

In 13th-century written charters, several Cockburns appear as landowners in Roxburghshire and Fifeshire. The land around Cockburn Law in Berwickshire was possibly the location of the residence of the 13th-century Pieres de Cokeburn; however, the nearby land may have been held by Cockburns as vassals of a more powerful land-owning family, such as the Dunbars. Cockburn Tower, a small fortified house (now a ruin) that occupied a site on the southern slope Cockburn Law overlooking the Whiteadder Water, was the seat of the Cockburns of that Ilk from about 1527 to 1696. The surrounding land was purchased in about 1527 by William Cockburn from Alexander Lindsay, 4th Earl of Crawford.  The Tower and surrounding land were auctioned off in 1696 to pay off the debts of Sir James Cockburn of that Ilk.

In 1330, Sir Alexander de Cokburne became the Baron of Langton (in Berwickshire), Carriden (in West Lothian) and Bolton (in East Lothian) following his marriage to the wealthy Anglo-Norman heiress Mariota de Veteriponte (also known as Maria de Vipont). The Langton estate was located to the southwest of Duns, about 6 km from Cockburn Tower. Sir Alexander's second marriage to the heiress Maria de Monfode added the estate of Skirling (in Peeblesshire). The greatly enlarged Cockburn lands were split up among Sir Alexander's three sons; however, the barony of Langton and Carriden remained with the eldest son Alexander. For the next 400 years, the Cockburns of Langton were prominent landowners in Berwickshire. Other branches of the family acquired estates in Ormiston and Clerkington (just southwest of Haddington) in East Lothian. The Cockburns of Henderland held land in Megget then in southern Peeblesshire, while the Cockburns of Skirling held land in the western part of Peebleshire.

William Cockburn of Henderland was a notorious border reiver in early part of the 16th century.  His well-known thievery and his purported close connections with his English counterparts just south of the border made him a target for the young King James V, who wished to clearly establish his authority over the more lawless parts of his kingdom.  William Cockburn was arrested in 1530, taken to Edinburgh, tried, convicted of treason and beheaded.  His lands and property were forfeited to the Crown. His son, also a William, succeeded in regaining his family's estate following an appeal in 1542 to the Regent, James, 2nd Earl of Arran.  However, his great-great-grandson, Samuel Cockburn, found it necessary to sell the Henderland estate in 1634.

By the middle of the 18th century, as a result of financial difficulties, the Langton and Ormiston branches of the Cockburn family lost most of their land holdings. Sir Archibald Cockburn, 4th Baronet of Langton borrowed increasing sums of money, primarily from the Cockburn of Cockburn branch of the family, to help finance ambitious agricultural reforms on his Langton estate.  These financial difficulties were not resolved by the three succeeding baronets of Langton.  At time of the death of Sir Alexander Cockburn, 7th Baronet at Fontenoy in 1745, the financial situation of the Langton branch had become critical. In 1747, his heir, Sir James Cockburn, 8th Baronet, was unable to fend off the claims of his creditors, which included Sir James Cockburn, 3rd Baronet Cockburn of that Ilk, Thomas Hay, and others.  The decision of the Lords of Session in Scotland in favor of the creditors was appealed to the House of Lords in London, but the earlier decision was upheld.  The resulting bankruptcy led to the auctioning off of the Estate of Langton, which was purchased in 1757 by David Gavin.  Despite the loss of their land, the Langton branch of the Cockburn family would continue to be prominent in Great Britain well into the 19th century, but now in the military and judicial arenas.  The Cockburn of Langton baronetcy went dormant in 1880 when the 12th Baronet, Sir Alexander Cockburn, died without legitimate issue.

The Ormiston branch of the Cockburn family stems from the marriage in 1370 of John Cokburne, second son of Sir Alexander de Cokburne, to Johanetta de Lyndessay, an heiress who owned the estate of Ormiston in East Lothian. John Cockburn of Ormiston and his brother Ninian Cockburn were Protestant supporters of the Scottish Reformation and came to support the English cause in 1548 during the war of the Rough Wooing. John Cockburn of Ormiston was another enthusiastic proponent for the modernization of Scottish agricultural practice. The financial consequences of his plans were as ruinous to the Ormiston branch of the Cockburns as they were to the Langton branch.  He attempted to demonstrate the benefits of his reforms in a model community at Ormiston.  His ambitious schemes ran into financial difficulties and he was required to sell the estate of Ormiston in 1747 to John Hope, 2nd Earl of Hopetoun.

Notable Cockburns 

 

Notable people with the surname Cockburn include:

 Adam Cockburn of Ormiston, Lord Ormiston (1656–1735), Scottish judge and Lord Justice Clerk
Adam Cockburn (actor), Australian actor and DJ
Alexander de Cokburne, Sir Alexander de Cokburne, Baron of Langton, Carriden, Bolton and Skirling, (c. 1310–c. 1370), prominent landowner in the Scottish Lowlands
Sir Alexander Cockburn, 12th Baronet (1802–1880), the 12th Baronet Cockburn of Langton and Lord Chief Justice
Alexander Cockburn (1941–2012), Irish-American journalist
Alison Cockburn (1712–1794), Scottish poet
Alistair Cockburn, software methodologist
Andrew Cockburn (ornithologist), Australian ornithologist
Andrew Cockburn (1947–), Irish-American journalist
Archibald Cockburn (1738–1820), Scottish judge 
Bill Cockburn (1937–1995), English footballer
Bronte Cockburn (born 1941), Australian basketball player
Bruce Cockburn (1945–), Canadian singer-songwriter
Catherine Trotter Cockburn (1679–c. 1749), British writer
Claud Cockburn (1904–1981), British journalist
Claudia Cockburn (1933–1998), British activist for the disabled
David Cockburn, Scottish coffee planter and District Collector in early 19th century Tamil Nadu, India
David Cockburn (1941–), British philosopher
Don Cockburn (1930-2017) Irish journalist, presenter and newsreader
Sir Francis Cockburn (1780–1868), British officer and colonial administrator
George Cockburne (died 1770), British captain and Comptroller of the Navy from 1756 to 1770
Sir George Cockburn (1772–1853), the 10th Baronet Cockburn of Langton and British naval admiral
George Bertram Cockburn, British chemist and pioneer aviator
Hampden Zane Churchill Cockburn (1867–1913), Canadian Army officer and recipient of the Victoria Cross
Henry Cockburn (bishop) (died 1476), 15th century Scottish bishop
Henry Thomas Cockburn (1779–1854), Scottish Whig, writer, lawyer, judge, Solicitor General for Scotland
Henry Cockburn (consul) (1859–1927), British consul
Henry Cockburn (footballer), English (soccer) footballer
Hermione Cockburn, British presenter
Jack Cockburn, Australian Rules footballer
James Cockburn (Royal Navy officer) (1817–1872), commanded ships during the Crimean War and then Commander-in-Chief, East Indies Station
James Cockburn (politician, born 1819) (1819–1883), Canadian politician and a Father of the Canadian Confederation of 1867
James Cockburn (minister) (1882–1973), Scottish scholar and Church of Scotland clergyman
James Pattison Cockburn (1779–1847), British artillery officer and important painter of watercolors in Upper and Lower Canada
John Cockburn of Ormiston, 16th-century Scottish landowner
John Cockburn (Scottish officer) (c. 1620–c. 1680), 17th-century Scottish Governor of Stirling Castle and Hume Castle
John Cockburn (Scottish politician), John Cockburn of Ormiston (c. 1685–1758), Scottish politician, landowner and agricultural reformer
John Cockburn (Australian politician) (1850–1929), Australian politician
John Cockburn (test pilot) (1937–2017), British test pilot of English Electric "Lightning"
Karen Cockburn (1980–), Canadian gymnast
Kofi Cockburn (born 1999), Jamaican basketball player
Leslie Cockburn (1952–), American writer and filmmaker
Martin Cockburn (1731–1818), Jamaican-born American planter (Fairfax County, Virginia). Neighbor and close friend of George Mason.
Ninian Cockburn (died 1579), 16th-century intriguer
Olivia Wilde (born Olivia Cockburn in 1984), American actress 
Patrick Cockburn (1950–), Irish journalist
Peter Cockburn, president of the Royal Philatelic Society London
Richard Cockburn of Clerkington (c. 1565–1627), Keeper of the Privy Seal of Scotland
Richard Cockburn Maclaurin, American educator and physicist
Robert Cockburn, Scottish bishop and diplomat during the Renaissance
Robert Cockburn (wine merchant) (1781–1844), soldier, wine merchant and founder of Cockburn's Port House
Robert Cockburn (physicist) (1909–1994), British physicist and key developer of electronic countermeasures during WWII
Rodney Cockburn (1877–1932), author of a book on South Australian place names
Sally Cockburn, Canadian-American mathematician
Sarah Cockburn (1939–2000), barrister and writer who used the pseudonym Sarah Caudwell
Samuel Cockburn (mercenary leader) (1574–1621), Scottish soldier who served in the Swedish army
Samuel Cockburn (physician and homeopath) (1823–1915), outspoken Scottish advocate for homeopathy
Stewart Cockburn (1921–2009), South Australian journalist and author, son of Rodney Cockburn
William Cockburn (cavalry officer) (c. 1605–1683), Scottish Royalist cavalry officer who led operations against Covenanter leaders in Ayrshire and Galloway
William Cockburn (physician) (1669–1739), Scottish physician who sold to the British Royal Navy a purported cure for dysentery

Cockburn baronetcies 

There have been two Cockburn Baronetcies in the Baronetage of Nova Scotia.

See also 
Cockburn (disambiguation)
Coburn (disambiguation)

References

External links 
 Sir Robert Cockburn, Bart., and Harry A. Cockburn, The Records of the Cockburn Family, Edinburgh (1913)
 Cockburn-Hood, Thomas H., The House of Cockburn of that Ilk, Edinburgh (1888)
Paradox of Medieval Scotland (PoMS) database
Cockburn Family DNA Project Website
Dunbar Surname DNA Project
L257 A North Sea Tribe

Cockburn
Scottish surnames
Surnames of Lowland Scottish origin
Cockburn
Word play